The 2022 IIHF World Championship Division III was an international ice hockey tournament run by the International Ice Hockey Federation.

The Group A tournament was held in Kockelscheuer, Luxembourg from 3 to 8 April and the Group B tournament in Cape Town, South Africa from 13 to 18 March 2022.

After the tournament was cancelled the two previous years due to the COVID-19 pandemic, all teams stayed put in their divisions.

The United Arab Emirates secured the top spot in Group A and were promoted to Division I, while South Africa won the Group B tournament and were promoted to Group A.

During the 2022 Russian invasion of Ukraine, Russia and Belarus were suspended from the 2022 and 2023 editions of the World Championship. In order to fill each group of the World Championships back to their normal amount of teams, the IIHF made the decision following the tournament not to relegate Luxembourg or Bosnia and Herzegovina, who finished last in Groups A and B respectively, but instead to promote Turkey and Thailand, the runners-up of each group.

Group A tournament

Participants

Match officials
Three referees and five linesmen were selected for the tournament.

Standings

Results
All times are local (UTC+2)

Statistics

Scoring leaders
List shows the top skaters sorted by points, then goals.

GP = Games played; G = Goals; A = Assists; Pts = Points; +/− = Plus/Minus; PIM = Penalties in Minutes; POS = Position
Source: IIHF.com

Goaltending leaders
Only the top five goaltenders, based on save percentage, who have played at least 40% of their team's minutes, are included in this list.

TOI = time on ice (minutes:seconds); SA = shots against; GA = goals against; GAA = goals against average; Sv% = save percentage; SO = shutouts
Source: IIHF.com

Awards

Group B tournament

Participants

Match officials
Two referees and three linesmen were selected for the tournament.

Standings

Results
All times are local (UTC+2)

Statistics

Scoring leaders
List shows the top skaters sorted by points, then goals.

GP = Games played; G = Goals; A = Assists; Pts = Points; +/− = Plus/Minus; PIM = Penalties in Minutes; POS = Position
Source: IIHF.com

Goaltending leaders
Only the top five goaltenders, based on save percentage, who have played at least 40% of their team's minutes, are included in this list.

TOI = time on ice (minutes:seconds); SA = shots against; GA = goals against; GAA = goals against average; Sv% = save percentage; SO = shutouts
Source: IIHF.com

Awards

References

External links
 Division IIIA official site
 Division IIIB official site

2022
Division III
2022 IIHF World Championship Division III
2022 IIHF World Championship Division III
Sports competitions in Cape Town
2022 in South African sport
April 2022 sports events in Europe
March 2022 sports events in Africa